Kiurike I  (alternatively spelled Gorige, Korike or Gurgen) was the first king of the Kingdom of Tashir-Dzoraget. He was succeeded by his son David I Anhoghin.

References

Year of birth unknown
989 deaths
Kiurikian dynasty
Kings of Tashir-Dzoraget